Police Trainer is a light gun arcade game released by American company P&P Marketing in 1996. A sequel, Police Trainer 2, was released in 2003.

Gameplay 
Players have only three lives to complete six exams in each of six difficulty stages; players can start at any difficulty of their choice, including:
Patrolman
Sergeant
Detective
Captain
Chief
Commissioner

Each exam is a mini-game with a goal for the player(s) to reach, usually a certain number of points, and test some aspect of the players' skills such as visual acuity, precision, marksmanship, timing, memory, and judgment. However, not only can players be penalized for shooting incorrect targets as instructed against, but players will also lose lives by either failing to reach these quotas and/or failing to complete a task during the exam (e.g., not defusing all C4 or letting the guards hit the player). Moreover, in order to complete the competition exams (in a 2-player game), both players must each lose one life. 
If players fail an exam, they can either try the same exam again or select another from the menu. Completion of an exam allows the player(s) to continue playing until they complete the entire stage. Players can put initials after completing the Commissioner difficulty.

Development 
Game credits are listed as follows:
 Electronics, software, game design : Fred Heyman
 Art direction, game design, Audio : Steve Boyer
 3D models and animations : Birdy Vanasupa
 3D models and animations, sound : Matthew Akers
 PCB layout : Dave Oermann
 Voices : Valerie Hartmann
 Current revision: Version 1.5

See also 
 List of light gun games

References

External links 
 Police Trainer at arcade-history.com

1996 video games
Arcade video games
Arcade-only video games
Light gun games
Video games about police officers
Video games developed in the United States